Fern nematode may refer to:
 Aphelenchoides fragariae
 Aphelenchoides olesistus

Animal common name disambiguation pages